Nebojša Zlatarić (11 December 1953 – 22 November 2014) was a Serbian former striker who spent most of his playing career in France.

References

External links
 Profile at om1899.com
 
 

1953 births
2014 deaths
Yugoslav footballers
Serbian footballers
Association football forwards
FK Mačva Šabac players
Olympique de Marseille players
Paris FC players
RC Lens players
Stade Rennais F.C. players
Valenciennes FC players
Ligue 1 players
Ligue 2 players
Sportspeople from Šabac